Chris Gayle is a West Indian cricketer who captained the West Indies cricket team from 2007 to 2010. A left-handed batsman, he has scored centuries (100 or more runs in a single innings) in Test and One Day International (ODI) matches on fifteen and twenty-five occasions respectively. He has also scored century in Twenty20 International (T20I) cricket on two occasions. Gayle made his Test debut in March 2000 against Zimbabwe, scoring 33 and 0. He made his first Test century the following year, scoring 175 against the same team during the first match of the 2001 series between the teams. Gayle's first double century came in June 2002 against New Zealand when he scored 204 in a man of the match performance in Queen's Park. He scored his first triple century against South Africa at Antigua Recreation Ground in May 2005. His highest score of 333—fourth highest total for the West Indies—came against Sri Lanka at the Galle International Stadium in November 2010. Gayle is one of four players to score two triple centuries in Test cricket. He has scored centuries against seven different opponents, and has been most successful against New Zealand and South Africa, making three against each of them. He has scored Test centuries at twelve different cricket grounds, including eight at venues outside the West Indies.

Gayle made his ODI debut in 1999 against India, and his maiden century in the format came three years later against Kenya at the Simba Union Ground. His highest score of 215 came during the 2015 Cricket World Cup against Zimbabwe at the Manuka Oval, Canberra. With five scores over 150 in ODIs, he is joint-third in the list. Gayle has scored ODI centuries at nineteen different cricket grounds. Eighteen of his ODI centuries came at fifteen different venues outside the West Indies.

Having made his first T20I appearance in February 2006, Gayle became the first player to score a century in the format when he made 117 against South Africa in the first match of the 2007 ICC World Twenty20. As of July 2018, he is one of nine players to have scored more than one century in the format. As of 2019, he is eleventh overall—tied with Sanath Jayasuriya—among all-time century-makers in international cricket.

Key

Test centuries

One Day International centuries

Twenty20 International centuries

Notes

References 

Gayle, Chris
Centuries